Canarium luzonicum, commonly known as elemi, is a tree native to the Philippines. The oleoresin harvested from it is also known as elemi.

Synonyms
 Canarium carapifolium G.Perkins
 Canarium oliganthum Merr.
 Canarium polyanthum G.Perkins
 Canarium triandrum Engl.
 Pimela luzonica Blume

Description
The leaves are alternate and are pinnate. Clusters of flowers, which are pollinated by insects, are followed by thick-shelled nuts with edible kernels.

Uses

Elemi resin is a pale yellow substance, of honey-like consistency. Aromatic elemi oil is steam distilled from the resin. It is a fragrant resin with a sharp pine and lemon-like scent. One of the resin components is called amyrin.

Elemi resin is chiefly used commercially in varnishes and lacquers, and certain printing inks. It is used as a herbal medicine to treat bronchitis, catarrh, extreme coughing, mature skin, scars, stress, and wounds. The constituents include phellandrene, limonene, elemol, elemicin, terpineol, carvone, and terpinolene.

The seed kernels are used for food, both raw and cooked. An edible oil can be extracted from the seeds, and the pulp can be stewed but is somewhat insipid. The young shoots can be boiled and eaten as a vegetable.

History of the name

The word elemi has been used at various times to denote different resins.  In the 17th and 18th centuries, the term usually denoted a resin from trees of the genus Icica in Brazil, and before that it meant the resin derived from Boswellia frereana.  The word, like the older term animi, appears to have been derived from enhaemon (εναιμον): the name of a styptic medicine said by Pliny to contain tears exuded by the olive tree of Arabia.

"The name Elemi is derived from an Arabic phrase meaning 'above and below', an abbreviation of 'As above, so below' and this tells us something about its action on the emotional and spiritual planes."

See also
Pili nut

References

J. Lawless, The Illustrated Encyclopedia of Essential Oils (Rockport, MA: Element Books, 1995), 59-67.
R. Tisserand, Essential Oil Safety (United Kingdom: Churchill Livingstone, 1995), 135.

luzonicum
Endemic flora of the Philippines
Flora of Luzon
Trees of the Philippines
Resins
Near threatened flora of Asia
Near threatened plants